Huamachuco Airport  is an airport serving Huamachuco, in the La Libertad Region of Peru. The very high elevation runway has mountainous terrain in all quadrants.

See also

Transport in Peru
List of airports in Peru

References

External links
OpenStreetMap - Huamachuco
OurAirports - Huamachuco

Airports in Peru
Buildings and structures in La Libertad Region